The Tennessee Soybean Festival in Martin, Tennessee is one of several local festivals which occur each year throughout the state. Beginning the first week of September, the festival celebrates the historical impact of the soybean crop on the economics of West Tennessee and specifically the City of Martin and Weakley County. Each year the festival features several locally-oriented events, various concerts, the Miss Soybean Festival Pageant (a qualifying event for the Miss Tennessee Pageant), the football home-opener for the University of Tennessee at Martin as well as a street fair.

The festival kicks off with the Mayor's Luncheon.

No festival was held in 2020, due to the COVID-19 pandemic.

Events
Soybean Festival Talent Show
Soybean Festival Parade
WPSD-TV's "What's It Worth?" (Similar to Antiques Road Show)
Soybean Festival Golf Tournament
Street Fair 
Concerts
Chicken Crazy, Hog Wild Barbecue Cook Off (sponsored by Tyson)
Soybean Festival 5k Run  
Soybean Festival Car & Bike Show
Super Retriever Series Super Fly & Super V Water Events

References

External links
Tennessee Soybean Festival

Festivals in Tennessee
Recurring events established in 1993
Tourist attractions in Weakley County, Tennessee
Soy products
Food and drink festivals in the United States